Jakob the Liar is a 1999 American war comedy-drama film directed by Peter Kassovitz, produced by Steven Haft, Marsha Garces Williams and written by Kassovitz and Didier Decoin. The film is based on the book of the same name by Jurek Becker. The film stars Robin Williams, Alan Arkin, Liev Schreiber, Hannah Taylor-Gordon, and Bob Balaban. The film is set in 1944 in a ghetto in German-occupied Poland during the Holocaust and tells the story of a Polish-Jewish shopkeeper named Jakob Heym who attempts to raise the morale inside the ghetto by sharing encouraging rumors that he claims he has heard on a radio. It is a remake of the 1975 East German-Czechoslovak film Jakob der Lügner.

Plot

In Poland of early 1944, a Polish-Jewish shopkeeper named Jakob Heym is summoned to the German headquarters after being falsely accused of being out after curfew. While waiting for the commander, Jakob overhears a German radio broadcast speaking about Soviet offensives. Returned to the ghetto, Jakob shares his information with a friend, sparking rumors that there is a secret radio within the ghetto. After hesitating, Jakob decides to use the chance to spread hope throughout the ghetto by continuing to tell the optimistic, fantastic tales that he allegedly heard from his "secret radio", and his lies keep hope and humor alive among the isolated ghetto inhabitants. He also has a real secret, in that he is hiding a young Jewish girl who escaped from an extermination camp deportation train.

However, the Gestapo learn of the mythical radio and begin a search for the resistance hero who dares operate it. Jakob surrenders himself to the Germans as they demand the person with the radio give himself up or risk hostages being killed. During interrogation, Jakob tells the police commander that he had only listened to the radio inside his office. He is ordered to announce publicly that this was all a lie, so the ghetto's liquidation would then proceed in an orderly fashion. When presented to the public, Jakob refuses to tell the truth, but is shot before he can make his own speech.

At the film's ending, Jakob says, post-mortem, that all the ghetto's residents were then deported and were never seen again. As in the novel, there is an alternate "but maybe it wasn't like that at all" ending where, following Jakob's death, the train carrying the Jewish prisoners to the death camps is halted by Soviet troops and the occupants released.

Cast
 Robin Williams as Jakob Heym
 Alan Arkin as Frankfurter
 Bob Balaban as Kowalsky
 Liev Schreiber as Mischa
 Armin Mueller-Stahl as Dr. Kirschbaum
 Hannah Taylor-Gordon as Lina Kronstein
 Mark Margolis as Fajngold
 Nina Siemaszko as Rosa
 Michael Jeter as Avron

Reception
Produced on a budget of $45 million, the film was released on September 24, 1999. According to Box Office Mojo, it opened in 1,200 theaters and made $2,056,647 in its opening weekend, placing eighth at the box office. The film's total domestic gross was just $4,956,401.

The film holds a rating of "rotten" on Rotten Tomatoes with only 29% positive reviews and an average rating of 4.7/10. The site's consensus states: "Any real story is buried by awkward performances and contrived situations." Roger Ebert gave the film two stars (out of four), comparing it to the similarly themed Life Is Beautiful by saying, "I prefer Life Is Beautiful, which is clearly a fantasy, to Jakob the Liar, which is just as contrived and manipulative, but pretends it is not." He went on to say about the acting in the film: "Williams is a talented performer who moves me in the right roles, but has a weakness for the wrong ones. The screenplay and direction are lugubrious, as the characters march in their overwritten and often overacted roles toward a foregone conclusion." Variety'''s Todd McCarthy also made comparisons with Life is Beautiful in his review, but he noted that Jakob the Liar was shot in late 1997, before Life is Beautiful had even premiered in Italy.

Williams received a Golden Raspberry Award nomination for Worst Actor for his performances in Jakob the Liar and Bicentennial Man, but lost to Adam Sandler, who was nominated for Big Daddy''.

See also
 Jacob the Liar (novel)
 List of Holocaust films

References

External links
 
 
 

1999 comedy-drama films
1999 films
American comedy-drama films
Columbia Pictures films
Films based on German novels
Holocaust films
Films scored by Edward Shearmur
Films set in 1944
Films set in Poland
Films shot in Budapest
Films about Jews and Judaism
American remakes of German films
Films produced by Steven Haft
1990s English-language films
1990s American films